James Cerretani and Dick Norman were the defending doubles champions at the SA Tennis Open tournament, but Norman chose to not participate this year.
Cerretani partnered up with Prakash Amritraj, but they lost in the first round 4–6, 6–7(6–8), against Eric Butorac and Rajeev Ram.
Rohan Bopanna and Aisam-ul-Haq Qureshi won in the final 6–2, 3–6, [10–5], against Karol Beck and Harel Levy.

Seeds

Draw

Draw

External links
 Main Draw Doubles

SA Tennis Open - Doubles
2010 SA Tennis Open
2010 in South African tennis